

Current listings

|}

Former listings

|}

Notes

References

Southwest Portland, Oregon
Southwest
South Portland, Oregon